The Mail Man is an extended play by American rapper E-40. It was released by Sick Wid It Records in 1993 on LP's and cassette's. The album features production by Mike Mosley, Sam Bostic, Studio Ton and E-40. It peaked at number 13 on the Billboard Top R&B/Hip-Hop Albums and at number 131 on the Billboard 200.

Along with a single, a music video was produced for the song, "Captain Save a Hoe", featuring The Click. Also released as a b-side on the same single, "Practice Lookin' Hard", was produced as a music video and features cameo appearances by Boots Riley, 2Pac, Celly Cel and Spice 1. "Ballin' Out of Control" was later re-released on E-40's 1998 double disc set, The Element of Surprise.

Jive Records reissued The Mail Man in 1994 with an alternate track listing.

Track listing

Original Sick Wid It release

Jive Reissue

Charts

Weekly charts

Year-end charts

Singles

References

External links
 [ The Mail Man] at Allmusic
 The Mail Man at Discogs

E-40 albums
1993 EPs
Albums produced by Studio Ton
Self-released albums
Jive Records EPs
Sick Wid It Records EPs
Gangsta rap EPs